The Rio Mondego or Mondego River is the longest river entirely within Portuguese territory. It has its source in Serra da Estrela, the highest mountain range in mainland Portugal (i.e. excluding the Portuguese islands).

Etymology 
The river's name is believed to be derived from the pre-Roman, Hispano-Celtic word Munda or Monda — by which names it had been referred to in the classical antiquity by Pliny and Ptolemy —, later latinised into Mondæcus until evolving into the present name.

Geography 
It flows through the districts of Guarda, Viseu and Coimbra, all in Central Portugal. It flows near the towns of Celorico da Beira, Fornos de Algodres, Nelas, Tábua, Carregal do Sal and Mortágua and the cities of Seia, Gouveia, Guarda, Oliveira do Hospital, Mangualde and Santa Comba Dão, before crossing the town of Penacova. The river widens by the city of Coimbra (a historical city, the largest of the region, with a university as a World Heritage Site), and the Montemor-o-Velho municipality (known for its castle and rice fields), before reaching the Atlantic Ocean at the city of Figueira da Foz.

There are two main dams along the Mondego, the Aguieira Dam and the Raiva Dam, as well as a smaller one at Coimbra's main bridge.

Tributaries 
One of its tributaries is the Rio Dão, which gives its name to the Dão wine region. Another is the Alva River, which enters the Mondego just before Penacova. The Ceira River enters the Mondego just south of Coimbra along National Road 17.

Gallery

See also 
Serra da Estrela
Baixo Mondego
Beiras
Coimbra
Figueira da Foz
Coimbra University
Castles in Portugal
Cities in Portugal

References 

Rivers of Portugal
Mondego basin
Coimbra
Geography of Guarda District